Lycée Emmanuel Mounier is a senior high school in Angers, Maine-et-Loire, France.

 it had 450 students.

References

External links
 Lycée Emmanuel Mounier 

Lycées in Maine-et-Loire
Buildings and structures in Angers
Education in Angers